Matthew vandenBerg is an American academic administrator serving as the 19th president of Presbyterian College in Clinton, South Carolina. He formerly served as the vice president for advancement and external relations at Alma College in Alma, Michigan.

Early life and education
vandenBerg graduated from Alma College with a Bachelor of Arts degree in 2002. He then earned a Master of Public Affairs degree from the O'Neill School of Public and Environmental Affairs at Indiana University Bloomington and a Doctor of Education degree from the University of Pennsylvania.

Career
vandenBerg served in a variety of positions before beginning his involvement in higher education. He served as an assistant vice president at fundraising management firm CCS Fundraising, and as a spokesperson for the chairman of the United States House Permanent Select Committee on Intelligence.

He has worked in higher education in alumni relations at Indiana University Bloomington and as a director of development at Albion College in Albion, Michigan, before taking a position at his alma mater, Alma College, as the vice president for advancement and external relations.

vandenBerg assumed the presidency of Presbyterian College on February 1, 2021, after he was named President-elect on October 28, 2020. He succeeded interim president Don Raber, who took office following Bob Staton's resignation on December 31, 2020.

References 

Year of birth missing (living people)
Living people
Alma College faculty
American academic administrators
American business executives
Alma College alumni
Indiana University alumni
University of Pennsylvania alumni
Presbyterian College faculty
Presidents of Presbyterian College
Indiana University Bloomington faculty
Albion College faculty